The Palmer Catholic Academy, previously known as Canon Palmer Catholic School, was the first Roman Catholic secondary academy school in Ilford, in London, England

The school consists of 5 buildings, each named after a notable Catholic figure. Palmer House, named after the school's founder, Canon Patrick Palmer; Heenan House; Kolbe House; Mother Teresa House; and Bede House. The school is a specialist science mathematics and computing college. The school recently received an Academy status and changed the name to "The Palmer Catholic Academy".

The Palmer Catholic Academy is an independent voluntary funded academy for boys and girls from 11 to 18. Founded as Canon Palmer Catholic School in 1961 with 300 students, it has grown greatly in numbers and stature now having over 1200 pupils as of 2019. The Palmer Catholic Academy also has a sixth form. It has had numerous headmasters over the course of its life, including Allison Moise Dixon 
the first female headteacher at the Academy and the current head teacher Mr Paul Downey.

The school predominantly promotes Catholic/Christian values but welcomes students of all faiths.

The school is a PE, Drama, and maths specialist school, while also boasting many regional sporting achievements.
In 2006, more than 60% of its pupils gained 5+ GCSEs.

Notable pupils
Stephen Gray (born 1988), cricketer
Robert Gilchrist (born 1990), basketballer

References

OFSTED Report

External links
Palmer Catholic Academy Website

Academies in the London Borough of Redbridge
Catholic secondary schools in the Diocese of Brentwood
Secondary schools in the London Borough of Redbridge